William Lundon (1839 – 24 March 1909) was an Irish nationalist politician and MP in the House of Commons of the United Kingdom of Great Britain and Ireland and as member of the Irish Parliamentary Party represented East Limerick when elected to the 27th Parliament of the United Kingdom at the 1900 general election and re-elected to the 28th Parliament at the 1906 general election.

Lundon, who was a professor of languages and teacher of classics, supported the Irish independent movement.  He was a member of the Fenian Brotherhood  and following the 1867 Fenian Rising, was imprisoned for two years under the Acts to Suspend the Rights of Habeas Corpus 1866. He also served a short prison sentence in 1889 for coercion during a period of protest in Ireland referred to as the Land War. During his time in the House of Commons he was described as a kindly figure and popular with his colleagues.

He died in office in March 1909, and the by-election for his seat was won by his son Thomas Lundon. His great grand nephew, is the first member of the family in Ireland since to enter the political affray after Thomas and is an active member of Sinn Féin based in the Tuam area of Galway East, Stiofán de Lundres Ó Dálaigh. Another great grand nephew is Tony Lundon.

A monument commemorating him stands in the grounds of Kilteely graveyard, which is situated in County Limerick, Ireland.

References

External links 
 

Irish Parliamentary Party MPs
1839 births
1909 deaths
Members of the Parliament of the United Kingdom for County Limerick constituencies (1801–1922)
UK MPs 1900–1906
UK MPs 1906–1910